Eosqualodon is a genus of squalodontid odontocete from the Late Oligocene to Early Miocene (Chattian-Aquitanian) of northwestern Germany and northeastern Italy.

Taxonomy and description
Two species are recognized, E. langewieschei and E. latirostris. The latter was originally described as a subspecies of Squalodon bariensis, S. b. latirostris, but is distinct from S. bariensis. Eosqualodon can be distinguished from Squalodon in having a broader rostral base, the caudal border of the external nares (blowhole) at the height of the caudal part of the orbits, and weakly developed intertemporal construction.

References

Miocene mammals of Europe
Oligocene mammals of Europe
Prehistoric toothed whales
Oligocene cetaceans
Miocene cetaceans
Miocene genus extinctions
Prehistoric cetacean genera